Anatoly Pavlovich Belkin (born 1953) is a contemporary Russian artist based in St. Petersburg.

One of his better-known works was the 2004 exhibition Swamp Gold at the State Hermitage Museum in Saint Petersburg.
The elaborate installation was composed of over 300 objects purporting to be evidence of the existence of a swamp-dwelling gnomish people in ancient Europe. It was created in collaboration with archaeologists from the museum and dealt with themes such as the disappearance of indigenous cultures and the loss of self in modern times.

Belkin studied art at the Repin Institute of Arts in Saint Petersburg and became one of the youngest members of the Soviet Nonconformist Art movement which consisted of artists who risked government persecution for exhibiting their work at shows not sponsored or sanctioned by the Soviet state.

Belkin's works are part of major museum collections in Russia and Europe, including Hermitage Museum in Saint Petersburg and Pushkin State Museum of Fine Arts in Moscow.

References

External links
Anatoly Belkin - Anatoly Pavlovich Belkin - Apartment
The State Hermitage Museum: Hermitage News
The State Hermitage Museum: Information

Living people
20th-century Russian painters
Russian male painters
21st-century Russian painters
1953 births
Russian avant-garde
Artists from Saint Petersburg
Place of birth missing (living people)
20th-century Russian male artists
21st-century Russian male artists